Osmond is a census-designated place (CDP) in Lincoln County, Wyoming, United States. The population was 397 at the 2010 census.

History
According to entertainer Marie Osmond, her paternal great-great-grandfather founded Osmond, Wyoming.

Geography
Highway 236 forms the northern edge of the community, and U.S. Route 89 forms the eastern edge.

References

Census-designated places in Lincoln County, Wyoming
Census-designated places in Wyoming